Mariano Berriex (born April 29, 1989 in Quilmes, Argentina) is an Argentine and Croatian professional footballer who currently plays as a winger for Club Real Potosí in Bolivia.

References

External links
 Profile at BDFA 
 

1989 births
Living people
Argentine footballers
Argentine expatriate footballers
Chilean Primera División players
Primera B de Chile players
Cypriot First Division players
Mariano Berriex
Liga 1 (Indonesia) players
Bolivian Primera División players
Club Atlético Independiente footballers
Ñublense footballers
Deportes Concepción (Chile) footballers
Deportes Temuco footballers
Rangers de Talca footballers
Aris Limassol FC players
Mariano Berriex
Mariano Berriex
PS TIRA players
Club Real Potosí players
Argentine people of French descent
Expatriate footballers in Chile
Expatriate footballers in Cyprus
Expatriate footballers in Greece
Expatriate footballers in Thailand
Expatriate footballers in Malaysia
Expatriate footballers in Bolivia
Association football wingers
People from Quilmes
Sportspeople from Buenos Aires Province